Crassodontidanus is an extinct genus of sharks and the sole member of the family Crassodontidanidae, in the order Hexanchiformes. It contains two extinct species.

Species
 Crassodontidanus serratus Fraas, 1855
 Crassodontidanus wiedenrothi Thies, 1983

References

Jurassic sharks
Cretaceous sharks
Fossils of Germany
Prehistoric shark genera
Sinemurian first appearances
Fossil taxa described in 2011
Hexanchiformes